Mountain View Estates, Alberta may refer to:

Mountain View Estates, Rocky View County, Alberta, a locality in Rocky View County, Alberta
Mountain View Estates, Yellowhead County, Alberta, a locality in Yellowhead County, Alberta